Novaya Derevnya is a rural locality (a selo) in Kabansky District, Republic of Buryatia, Russia. The population was 60 as of 2010. There are 10 streets.

Geography 
Novaya Derevnya is located 47 km north of Kabansk (the district's administrative centre) by road. Krasny Yar is the nearest rural locality.

References 

Rural localities in Kabansky District